Esplais Catalans is a non-religious and progressive association where volunteerism is our way of work to change the society. In the entity, the esplai is a citizen school for children, youth, families and leaders; a popular education way. Esplais Catalans is the result of the esplais’ and people's willingness to have exchanging, learning and join action places. Equality, freedom, associative participation, environmental education and Children's Rights are promoted in Esplais Catalans.

References

External links
Official website (in Catalan, Spanish and English)

Organisations based in Catalonia